This is a list of National Hockey League (NHL) players who have played at least one game in the NHL from 1917 to present and have a last name that starts with "W".

List updated as of the 2018–19 NHL season.

Wa

 Don Waddell
 Austin Wagner
 Chris Wagner
 Steven Wagner
 Oliver Wahlstrom
 Frank "Deacon" Waite
 Jimmy Waite
 Darcy Wakaluk
 Ernie Wakely
 Gordie Walker
 Howard Walker
 Jack Walker
 Kurt Walker
 Matt Walker
 Nathan Walker
 Russ Walker
 Scott Walker
 Sean Walker
 Bob Wall
 Michael Wall 
 Tim Wallace
 Jesse Wallin
 Niclas Wallin
 Peter Wallin
 Rickard Wallin
 Lucas Wallmark
 Jake Walman
 Derrick Walser
 James "Flat" Walsh
 Jim Walsh
 Mike Walsh
 Ben Walter
 Ryan Walter
 Bob Walton
 Mike Walton
 Wes Walz
 Rick Wamsley
 Tom Wandell
 Kyle Wanvig
 Gord Wappel
 Aaron Ward
 Cam Ward
 Dixon Ward
 Don Ward
 Ed Ward
 Jason Ward
 Jimmy Ward
 Joe Ward
 Joel Ward
 Lance Ward
 Ron Ward
 Jeff Ware
 Mike Ware
 Eddie Wares
 Bob Warner
 Jim Warner
 Rhett Warrener
 Todd Warriner
 David Warsofsky
 Bill Warwick
 Grant Warwick
 Steve Washburn
 Nick Wasnie
 Francis Wathier
 Austin Watson
 Bill Watson
 Bryan Watson
 Dave Watson
 Harry Watson
 Jim Watson
 Jimmy Watson
 Joe Watson
 Phil Watson
 Jim Watt
 Mike Watt
 Tim Watters
 Brian Watts

We–Wh

 Jordan Weal
 Mike Weaver
 Steve Webb 
 Mike Weber
 Shea Weber
 Yannick Weber
 Aubrey Webster
 Don Webster
 John "Chick" Webster
 Tom Webster
 Scott Wedgewood
 Anton Wedin
 MacKenzie Weegar
 Kevin Weekes
 Steve Weeks
 Doug Weight
 Cooney Weiland
 Mattias Weinhandl
 Eric Weinrich
 Stan Weir
 Wally Weir
 Dale Weise
 Stephen Weiss
 Noah Welch
 Andy Welinski
 Alexander Wellington
 Craig Weller
 Casey Wellman
 Chris Wells
 Jay Wells
 Eric Wellwood
 Kyle Wellwood
 Jeremy Welsh
 Alexander Wennberg
 John Wensink
 Marvin Wentworth
 Brad Werenka
 Zach Werenski
 Adam Werner
 Brian Wesenberg
 Blake Wesley
 Glen Wesley
 Duvie Westcott
 Ed Westfall
 Kevin Westgarth
 Tommy Westlund
 Erik Westrum
 Carl Wetzel
 Ken Wharram
 Len Wharton
 Simon Wheeldon
 Blake Wheeler
 Don Wheldon
 Bill Whelton
 Rob Whistle
 Bill White
 Brian White
 Colin White (born 1977)
 Colin White (born 1997)
 Colton White
 Ian White
 Moe White
 Peter White
 Ryan White
 Sherman White
 Todd White
 Tony White
 Wilfred "Tex" White
 Zach Whitecloud
 Bob Whitelaw
 Trent Whitfield
 Bob Whitlock
 Kay Whitmore
 Joe Whitney
 Ray Whitney
 Ryan Whitney
 Sean Whyte

Wic–Wil

 Roman Wick
 Doug Wickenheiser
 Chris Wideman
 Dennis Wideman
 Juha Widing
 Jason Widmer
 Art Wiebe
 Jason Wiemer
 Jim Wiemer
 Patrick Wiercioch
 Adam Wilcox
 Archie Wilcox
 Barry Wilcox
 Archie Wilder
 Jim Wiley
 Bob Wilkie
 David Wilkie
 Barry Wilkins
 Derek Wilkinson
 John Wilkinson
 Neil Wilkinson
 Brian Wilks
 Roman Will
 Rod Willard
 Burr Williams
 Darryl Williams
 David Williams
 Fred Williams
 Gord Williams
 Jason Williams
 Jeremy Williams
 Justin Williams
 Sean Williams
 Tiger Williams
 Tom Williams (born 1940)
 Tom Williams (born 1951)
 Warren "Butch" Williams
 Jordan Willis
 Shane Willis
 Brian Willsie
 Don Willson
 Clarke Wilm
 Behn Wilson
 Bert Wilson
 Bob Wilson
 Carey Wilson
 Clay Wilson
 Colin Wilson
 Cully Wilson
 Doug Wilson
 Dunc Wilson
 Garrett Wilson
 Gord Wilson
 Hub Wilson
 Jerry Wilson
 Johnny Wilson
 Kyle Wilson
 Landon Wilson
 Larry Wilson
 Mike Wilson
 Mitch Wilson
 Murray Wilson
 Rick Wilson
 Rik Wilson
 Roger Wilson
 Ron Wilson (born 1955)
 Ron Wilson (born 1956)
 Ross Wilson
 Ryan Wilson
 Scott Wilson
 Tom Wilson
 Wally Wilson

Win–Wy

 Brad Winchester
 Jesse Winchester
 Murray Wing
 Tommy Wingels
 Hal Winkler
 Chris Winnes
 Daniel Winnik
 Brian Wiseman
 Chad Wiseman
 Eddie Wiseman
 Ty Wishart
 James Wisniewski
 Jim Wiste
 Johan Witehall
 Jim Witherspoon
 Steve Witiuk
 Luke Witkowski
 Brendan Witt
 Steve Wochy
 Benny Woit
 Christian Wolanin
 Craig Wolanin
 Bennett Wolf
 David Wolf
 Bernie Wolfe
 Wojtek Wolski
 Mike Wong
 Bob Wood
 Dody Wood
 Miles Wood
 Randy Wood
 Dan Woodley
 Alex Woods
 Brendan Woods
 Paul Woods
 Jason Woolley
 Peter Worrell
 Lorne "Gump" Worsley
 Roy Worters
 Chris Worthy
 Kevin Wortman
 Tyler Wotherspoon
 Mark Wotton
 Bob Woytowich
 Jeff Woywitka
 Andy Wozniewski
 Ken Wregget
 Bob Wren
 James Wright
 Jamie Wright
 John Wright
 Keith Wright
 Larry Wright
 Tyler Wright
 Ralph Wycherley
 Bill Wylie
 Duane Wylie
 James Wyman
 Randy Wyrozub

See also
hockeydb.com NHL Player List - W

Players